William Alexander Ahlemeyer (July 20, 1907 – May 21, 1952) was a German-born American handball player. He was a member of the United States men's national handball team. He was a part of the  team at the 1936 Summer Olympics, playing 3 matches. On club level he played for German-American AC Queens in the United States.

References

External links 
 
 

1907 births
1952 deaths
American male handball players
Olympic handball players of the United States
Field handball players at the 1936 Summer Olympics
20th-century American people